Hakan Demir may refer to:

 Hakan Demir (coach) (born 1968), Turkish basketball coach
 Hakan Demir (footballer) (born 1998), Turkish footballer
 Hakan Demir (politician) (born 1984), German politician